Karakoro is a commune in the Cercle of Kayes in the Kayes Region of south-western Mali. The commune contains seven villages: Teichibé, Souena Soumaré, Souena Gandéga, Souena Toucouleur, Boutinguisse, Kalinioro and Aïté. The main village (chef-lieu) is Teichibe. In 2009 the commune had a population of 14,813.

References

External links
.

Communes of Kayes Region